Austrian Argentines are Argentine citizens of Austrian descent or Austrian-born people who emigrated to Argentina. Many Austrian descendants in Argentina arrived in the country from other parts of Europe when Austria was a unified kingdom with Hungary.

Austrian immigration has been linked to other migratory flows towards the South American country as the German and Swiss immigration waves, among others.

History 

Austrian immigrants who came to Argentina did during the two great migratory waves, i.e., about the First and Second World War. The main settlement sites were Buenos Aires, Córdoba and Misiones; in the south, cities like San Carlos de Bariloche and San Martín de los Andes were among the main destinations for Austrians. The amount has never exactly been relieved and there are mostly estimates. In the early thirties, there were approximately 240,000 German-speaking people of whom 45,000 resided in Buenos Aires, and since about 9,000 were of Austrian descent. These figures are similar to those recorded in the Austrian Embassy, approximately 7,000 people of Austrian descent in Buenos Aires, considering the probability of being greater. Since the mid-nineteenth century there had been established a German-speaking colony in the neighbourhood of Belgrano, Buenos Aires. The Austrian and Swiss residents in Buenos Aires were integrated into this colony by the language and cultural affinity in general. This neighbourhood was very attractive to new immigrants since it already had adequate infrastructure, as churches, cafes and bakeries in German families that had arisen due to the former colony. Argentina is, ethnographically, the Latin American country with the largest number of immigrants and descendants of Austrian immigrants (second ranks Brazil and Uruguay in the third) with Córdoba as home to the main Austrian community, which is the province with the largest immigrant population of both German and Austrian descent in the country.

Organisations 
Among the Austrian institutions in the country are: the Austrian-Argentine Association (member of the European Club), the San Isidro Austria Club, the Austrian Benevolent Society, the Austrian-Argentine Chamber of Commerce, the House of Austria in Rosario and the Austrian-Argentine Association of Bariloche.

Austrian settlements in Argentina 

Some of the settlement areas along the last century were:

Chaco 
 Resistencia
 Quitilipi

Córdoba 
 Villa General Belgrano
 Colonia Tirolesa

Entre Ríos 
 San Benito

Formosa 
 Colonia Formosa

Misiones 
 Eldorado

Río Negro 
 Villa Regina

Santa Fe 
 Avellaneda

See also 
Argentina–Austria relations
Argentines of European descent
German Argentine
Swiss Argentines

References 

Argentina
Austrian